Nappersdorf-Kammersdorf is a town in the district of Hollabrunn in Lower Austria, Austria.

Geography
Nappersdorf-Kammersdorf lies in the hills of the Weinviertel in Lower Austria northeast of Hollabrunn, about 70 km north of Vienna on the way from Hollabrunn to Laa an der Thaya. About 7.05 percent of the municipality is forested.

References

Cities and towns in Hollabrunn District